Michael W. Hoover (born December 21, 1951) is an American jurist and a retired judge of the Wisconsin Court of Appeals.  Hoover served on the court's Wausau-based District III from 1997 until his retirement in 2015.

Life and career
Hoover was born in Milwaukee and was raised in the neighboring city of Wauwatosa. Hoover graduated with honors from the University of Wisconsin-Madison in 1974 and cum laude from the University of Wisconsin Law School in 1978. He is a member of the Order of the Coif.  From 1978 until 1980, he served as an assistant district attorney in Marathon County; from 1980 to 1988, he worked in private practice and as an assistant city attorney in Wausau. In 1988, Hoover was elected to the Marathon County Circuit Court.

In 1997, Hoover contested a vacant seat on District III of the Wisconsin Court of Appeals, chambered in Wausau.  In the April general election, he defeated Port Wing attorney and future Court of Appeals judge Gary Sherman.  Hoover served as presiding judge of District III from 1999 until his retirement in 2015, and served as the court's deputy chief judge from 2012.  Judge Mark Seidl was elected to replace Hoover in April 2015.

References

Politicians from Milwaukee
Politicians from Wausau, Wisconsin
Wisconsin Court of Appeals judges
Wisconsin lawyers
University of Wisconsin–Madison alumni
University of Wisconsin Law School alumni
1951 births
Living people
Lawyers from Milwaukee